Giulio Agricola is an underground station on Line A of the Rome Metro. It is located on Via Tuscolana, on the junction with Viale Giulio Agricola and Viale Marco Fulvio Nobiliore, in an area where roads and squares are named after Roman commanders and consuls.

The station is the setting for the short film Ultimo Metro with Debora Calì.

References

External links

Rome Metro Line A stations
Rome Q. XXIV Don Bosco
Rome Q. XXV Appio Claudio
Railway stations opened in 1980